James Herbert Darby (26 October 1865 – 7 November 1943) was an English first-class cricketer. A right-handed batsman, he made his first-class debut for Hampshire in 1884 against Sussex, in what was to be the club's final season with first-class status until the 1895 County Championship.

Darby made his next first-class appearance for Hampshire in 1897, against the Warwickshire. That season Darby played two more Championship matches against Yorkshire and Sussex, which was his final first-class match.

Darby died in Fareham, Hampshire on 7 November 1943.

External links
James Darby at Cricinfo
James Darby at CricketArchive

1865 births
1943 deaths
People from Fareham
English cricketers
Hampshire cricketers